National Tsing Hua University Scientific Research Industrialization Platform of Five Universities Alliance ("Tsinghua Big Five Alliance") is a platform for industrialization of scientific research (industry-university alliance) supported by the Ministry of Science and Technology of Taiwan (MOST), with the National Tsing Hua University (NTHU) in Hsinchu as the head, and the integration of five universities.

Organization
National Tsing Hua University (NTHU), in line with the policy of the Ministry of Science and Technology, promotes the development of "industrial demand-oriented", "cutting-edge technology research and development", "multi-industry cooperation themes" and "industrialization of scientific research results" in Taiwan's industry-university cooperation. On January 27, 2021, five major universities in Taiwan including NTHU form an alliance.

The five universities have formed teams with complementary fields, and cooperated with each other to develop technology and cultivate talents in major fields (below), and build an industry-university cooperation model of "enterprise questions and schools solve problems".

History
 January 27, 2021: The alliance was formed.
 June 2021: Fu Jen Catholic University (FJCU) and National Tsing Hua University (NTHU) "SPARK Taiwan Program" began to call for applications.
 September 2021: FJCU and Eastern Media International (EMI) signed a contract to establish the "Fu Jen-EMI Health Industry-Academia Center" and "Fu Jen-EMI Smart Data Center". Representatives from the five universities jointly observed the ceremony.
 November 2021:
 2021 Japan-Taiwan Symposium. The president of Japan Society for the Promotion of Science (JST), Michijo Hamaguchi, and Kyoto University, Nara Institute of Science and Technology, FJCU, and NTHU presidents, vice presidents and scholars (including Nobel-level scholar Susumu Kitagawa) attended the meeting.
 The Alliance exhibited at BioASIA International Conference & Exhibition.

COVID-19 rapid test service 
In response to the worldwide COVID-19 pandemic, the Alliance has been established to provide rapid test services to domestic enterprises, which will be implemented by Fu Jen Catholic University and Fu Jen Catholic University Hospital.

See also
National Applied Research Laboratories
Industrial Technology Research Institute

References

External links
Official page in NTHU
Official page in MOST

Scientific organizations based in Taiwan
2021 establishments in Taiwan
National Tsing Hua University
National Chengchi University
Fu Jen Catholic University
Feng Chia University
Tamkang University
College and university associations and consortia in Asia
University systems in Taiwan